Zones is a 1997 young adult science fiction novel by Damien Broderick and Rory Barnes. It follows the story of Jenny who receives a phone call from another year.

Publishing history
Zones was first published in Australia in 1997 by Moonstone, a division of HarperCollins Australia, in trade paperback format. In 2004 it was released as a braille book by Vision Australia Information and Library Service. 
In 2012, it appeared in print in the US for the first time, from Borgo/Wildside.

Synopsis
The protagonist is a teenager called Jenny who lives in Melbourne with her father and enjoys physics.  She has a typical life until receiving a phone call from a boy from the year 1965.

Awards
Zones was a short-list nominee for the 1997 Aurealis Award for best young-adult novel and best science fiction novel but lost to Catherine Jinks' Eye to Eye and Greylands by Isobelle Carmody in the young-adult category and to Broderick's The White Abacus in the science fiction category.

References

1997 novels
Australian science fiction novels
1997 science fiction novels
Australian young adult novels
Children's science fiction novels
HarperCollins books